Frank "Lefty" Holmes (February 28, 1907 – December 27, 1987), also nicknamed "Sonny", "Ducky", and "Eddie", was an American baseball pitcher in the Negro leagues. A native of Brunswick, Georgia, he was the brother of fellow Negro leaguer Philly Holmes, and played from 1929 to 1940 with multiple clubs. Holmes died in his hometown of Brunswick in 1987 at age 80.

References

External links
 and Baseball-Reference Black Baseball stats and Seamheads

Lincoln Giants players
Cuban House of David players
Baltimore Black Sox players
Philadelphia Stars players
Washington Elite Giants players
New York Cubans players
Washington Black Senators players
1907 births
1987 deaths
Baseball pitchers